Herbert Thomas Postle (28 September 1884 – 24 July 1961) was an Australian politician. Born in Melbourne, he received a Bachelor of Law in 1913, a Bachelor of Arts in 1915, a Master of Law and a Master of Arts in 1917, a Diploma of Education in 1919 and a Doctorate of Law in 1920 from Melbourne University. In 1933 he was elected in a countback to the Tasmanian House of Assembly as a Nationalist member for Bass; he was defeated the following year. Postle died in Melbourne in 1961.

References

1884 births
1961 deaths
Nationalist Party of Australia members of the Parliament of Tasmania
Members of the Tasmanian House of Assembly
Politicians from Melbourne
Melbourne Law School alumni
20th-century Australian politicians